East Smithfield is a small locality in the London Borough of Tower Hamlets, east London, and also a short street, a part of the A1203 road. 
Once broader in scope, the name came to apply to the part of the ancient parish of St Botolph without Aldgate that was outside of the City of London.

The old Royal Mint and the eastern part of St Katherine's Docks are located in the district.

The street
The street runs eastward from Tower Hill, with the name changing to The Highway after quarter of a mile. The street is on the route of both the London Marathon and the London Triathlon. At one time the street was known as Upper East Smithfield with the eastern part of St Katharine's Way (the part within East Smithfield) known as Lower East Smithfield.

History of the district

Civil and ecclesiastical administration

Portsoken Ward
John Stow recounts the origin of the area from the Liber Trinitae, where the Saxon King Edgar was petitioned by 13 knights to grant them the wasteland to the East of the city wall, desiring to form a guild. The request was said to be granted on condition that each knight should "accomplish three combats, one above the ground, one below the ground, and the third in the water; after this, at a certain day in East Smithfield, they should run with spears against all comers; all of which was gloriously performed; and the same day the King named it Knighten Guilde, and so bounded it from Ealdgate (Aldgate) to the place where the bars now are toward the east, &c. and again toward the south unto to the river of Thames, and so into the water, and throw his speare; so that all East Smithfield, with the right part of the street that goeth by Dodding Pond into the Thames and also the hospital of St Katherin's, with the mills that were founded in King Stephen's daies, and the outward stone wall, and the new ditch of the Tower, are of the saide fee and liberbertie."

The strip of land became known as the Portsoken, an extramural ward of the City of London which originally extended as far south of the Thames. The name East Smithfield - derived from smoothfield - was applied to an area corresponding, either exactly or approximately, to the Portsoken. Portsoken later lost its southern, riverside, section and the term East Smithfield was subsequently applied only to the part taken out of the Portsoken.

Land ownership and privileges
Later, Edward the Confessor confirmed the liberties upon the heirs, and these were again confirmed in the reign of William Rufus. 

By 1115, during the reign of Henry I, the entire soke, or liberty, was given to the church of Holy Trinity within Aldgate, which had been founded in 1107 by Matilda, Henry's Queen. The prior of the Abbey was then to sit as an ex officio Alderman of London. The gift was not without problems. The Constable of the Tower, Geoffrey de Mandeville had cultivated a piece of ground in East Smithfield, adjacent to the Tower, as a vineyard. He refused to give it up and defended it with the garrison.

The southern part of East Smithfield was given by Holy Trinity Priory as a site for the Hospital of St Katharine, founded by Matilda (wife of Stephen of England), in 1148. Further foundations were bestowed by Eleanor (widow of Henry III) and Philippa (wife of Edward III). The importance of the hospital was such that the whole of East Smithfield came to be deemed within the Precinct of St Katharine.

In 1442, the neighbourhood "was constituted a Precinct free from jurisdiction civil or ecclesiastical, except that of the Lord Chancellor". With the Dissolution of the Monasteries by King Henry VIII in 1531, the land became the property of the Crown, and many of the religious houses were given to prominent nobles. The hospital of St Katharine was not seized, but re-established as a Protestant house — with houses and a brewery being built within the precincts.

Over time, the area had become divided and further sub-divided. In 1294, the liberty of the Minories was formed around the Minoresses of St. Mary of the Order of St. Clare. Similarly, to the east, was the liberty of Well Close. By the 17th century, the rights, peculiarities and administration of these tiny areas was becoming increasing anachronistic, and in 1686, they were subsumed into the Liberties of the Tower of London.

A further monastic house was the Abbey of St Mary Graces (or Eastminster), but this seems not to have had an administrative unit associated with it.

From 1855, the whole area of the former East Smithfield was reunited under the administration of the Whitechapel District.

Plague
Between 1347–1351, the Black Death struck the City. Two cemeteries were opened in East Smithfield to take the dead from London. During the epidemic, 200 bodies a day were buried, in mass graves, stacked five deep. In 2007, a study led by the University of Albany, NY exhumed and examined 490 skeletons – finding that the disease afflicted disproportionately the already weak and malnourished.

Migration
By 1236 Jews were settled here for protection by the Tower garrison — until their expulsion in 1290.

Foreign ships were not permitted to use the wharfs within the City, and St Katharine's Quay came to be used extensively for unloading these, particularly Dutch ships. Many French settled here, after the loss of Calais. A large number were from the districts of Hammes and Guisnes, leading to a part of the Precinct becoming known as Hangman's Gains. With trade in the City regulated by the City, St Katharine became an area for foreign settlement. At the end of the 19th century, the quay was the terminus for passenger boats arriving from northern Europe, and became the arrival point for Ashkenazi Jews fleeing persecution in eastern Europe. Many settled around Whitechapel and Spitalfields, only a half–mile to the north.

Poverty and philanthropy
In 1844, "An Association for promoting Cleanliness among the Poor" was established, and they built a bath-house and laundry in Glasshouse Yard. This cost a single penny for bathing or washing, and by June 1847 was receiving 4,284 people a year. This led to an Act of Parliament to encourage other municipalities to build their own, and the model spread quickly throughout the East End. Timbs noted that "... so strong was the love of cleanliness thus encouraged that women often toiled to wash their own and their children's clothing, who had been compelled to sell their hair to purchase food to satisfy the cravings of hunger".

Economic Activity
A Pentecost fair was granted in the district in 1229. The Royal Mint moved from the Tower of London, to a site at the end of East Smithfield in 1809. Today, this building, by Robert Smirke and its gatehouse are all that remain; the rest being swept away by continual expansion, until in November 1975, the London Mint was closed and production transferred to Wales. The site is intended to become the new Chinese Embassy.
In 1828, St Katharine Docks were constructed on the site of the hospital, and some 11,000 persons were evicted from the slum to find their own replacement lodgings.

See also
Smithfield, London - Sometimes referred to as West Smithfield

Transport
The nearest Docklands Light Railway station is Tower Gateway.

The nearest London Underground station is Tower Hill on the District and Circle lines.

References

Streets in the London Borough of Tower Hamlets